The Oromo (pron.  Oromo: Oromoo) are a Cushitic ethnic group native to the Oromia region of Ethiopia and parts of Northern Kenya, who speak the Oromo language (also called Afaan Oromoo or Oromiffa), which is part of the Cushitic branch of the Afroasiatic language family. They are one of the largest ethnic groups in Ethiopia.

The Oromo people traditionally used the gadaa system as the primary form of governance. A leader is elected by the gadaa system and their term lasts eight years, with an election taking place at the end of those eight years. Although most modern Oromos are Muslims and Christians, about 3% practice Waaqeffanna, the native ancient monotheistic religion of Oromos.

Origins and nomenclature

The Oromo people are one of the oldest cushitic peoples inhabiting the Horn of Africa, as there is still no correct estimate of the history of their settlement in the region, but many indications suggest that they have been living in north Kenya and south-east Ethiopia for more than 7000 years until the great expansion in 1520 where then they expanded to the south-west and some locations in the north. 
Both older and subsequent colonial era documents mention and refer to the Oromo people as Galla, which has now developed derogatory connotations, but these documents were generally written by members of other ethnic groups. The first verifiable record mentioning the Oromo people by a European cartographer is in the map made by the Italian Fra Mauro in 1460, which uses the term Galla. According to Herbert S. Lewis, both the Oromo and the Somali people originated in southern Ethiopia but the Somali expanded to the east and north much earlier than the Galla, and the Galla lived only in southern Ethiopia and northern Kenya until the Oromo migrations began about 1530.

The term Galla, stated Juxon Barton in 1924, was in use for Oromo people by Abyssinians and Arabs. It was a term for a river and a forest, as well as for the pastoral people established in the highlands of southern Ethiopia. This historical information, according to Mohammed Hassen, is consistent with the written and oral traditions of the Somalis. A journal published by the International African Institute suggests it is an Oromo word (adopted by neighbors), for there is a word, meaning 'wandering' or 'to go home' in their language.

The Oromo never called themselves Galla and resist its use because the term is considered derogatory. They traditionally identified themselves by one of their clans (s) and now use the common umbrella term of Oromo which connotes "free born people". The word Oromo is derived from  meaning '[The] Children of Orma', or 'Sons of Strangers', or 'Man, stranger'. The first known use of the word Oromo to refer to the ethnic group is traceable to 1893.

After Fra Mauro's mention, there is a profusion of literature about the peoples of this region, including the Oromo, particularly mentioning their wars and resistance to religious conversion, primarily by European explorers and Catholic Christian missionaries. The earliest primary account of Oromo ethnography is the 16th-century "History of Galla" by Christian monk Bahrey who comes from the Sidama country of Gammo, written in the Ge'ez language. According to an 1861 book by D'Abbadie, the Oromo are mentioned as the Galla in several maps and historical events. One mention of the Oromo before the Oromo expansion was when the Oromo led a campaign against the Sultanate of Ifat, the campaign being named Meeshii Dir Dhabi. The Oromo led an expedition against the Issa Dir clan who inhabited the great city. The Cisse clan would be victorious, ending the campaign. The Cisse would rule the city for the next two centuries till the expansion/Migration of the Oromo. One inscription of the Oromo from the 14th century notes that the Oromo inhabited Ethiopia long before the Oromo migration and founded several civilisations, including the Wej, Bale, Arsi, and Dawaro. Sihabudin also mentioned that the Werra Qallo, who now inhabit Hararghe, were living in Dawaro long before the Oromo migration.  Historical evidence suggests that the Oromo people were already established in the southern highlands in or before the 15th century and that at least some Oromo people were interacting with other Ethiopian ethnic groups. According to Alessandro Triulzi, the Oromo would get in contact and interact with the Nilo Saharan Groups.

Historical linguistics and comparative ethnology studies suggest that the Oromo people probably originated around the lakes Lake Chew Bahir and Lake Chamo. They are a Cushitic people who have inhabited the East and Northeast Africa since at least the early 1st millennium. The aftermath of the sixteenth century Ethiopian–Adal war led to Oromos to move to the north. The Harla were assimilated by the Oromo in Ethiopia. While Oromo people have lived in the region for a long time, the ethnic mixture of peoples who have lived here is unclear. The Oromos increased their numbers through Oromization (Meedhicca, Mogasa and Gudifacha), assimilation, and forced assimilation of other ethnic groups, as well as the inclusion of mixed peoples (Gabbaro). The native ancient names of the territories were replaced by the name of the Oromo clans who conquered it while the people were made Gabbaros.

History

Pre-19th century

The earliest known documented and detailed history of the Oromo people was by the Ethiopian monk Bahrey who wrote Zenahu lä Galla in 1593, though the synonymous term Gallas was mentioned in maps or elsewhere much earlier. After the 16th century, they are mentioned more often, such as in the records left by Abba Paulos, Joao Bermudes, Jerónimo Lobo, Galawdewos, Sarsa Dengel and others. These records suggest that the Oromo were pastoral people in their history who stayed together. Their animal herds expanded rapidly, and they needed more grazing lands. They began migrating, not together, but after separating. They lacked kings, and had elected leaders called  based on a  system of government instead. By the late 16th century, two major Oromo confederations emerged: Afre and Sadaqa, which respectively refer to four and three in their language, with Afre emerging from four older clans, and Sadaqa out of three. These Oromo confederations were originally located in southern Ethiopia, specifically the northwest of the Borena Zone near Lake Abaya, but started moving north in the 16th century in what is termed as the "Great Oromo Migration".

According to Richard Pankhurst, a British-born Ethiopian historian, this migration is linked to the first incursions into inland Horn of Africa by Imam Ahmad ibn Ibrahim. According to historian Marianne Bechhaus-Gerst, the migration was one of the consequences of the fierce Ethiopian–Adal war which killed a lot of people and depopulated the regions near the Galla lands, but also probably a result of droughts in their traditional homelands. Further, they acquired horses and their  system helped coordinate well-equipped Oromo warriors who enabled fellow Oromos to advance and settle into newer regions starting in the 1520s. This expansion continued through the 17th century.

Historically, Afaan Oromo-speaking people used their own Gadaa system of governance. A leader elected by the gadaa system remains in power only for 8 years, with an election taking place at the end of those 8 years. Whenever an  dies while exercising his functions,  (the symbol of power) passes to his wife and she keeps the bokkuu and proclaims the laws.

Oromos also established a number of small independent kingdoms in the Gibe region, such as Gomma, Gomma, Gumma, Jimma and Limmu-Ennarea.

They would also establish dynasties such as the Yejju dynasty that would be de facto rulers of Ethiopian Empire from 1784–1853 this period was known as Zemene Mesafint, they would particularly have control over the provinces of Begemder and Gojjam. Notable rulers such as Gugsa of Yejju found cities like Debre Tabor and for a period even change the official language of the empire from Amharic to Oromiffa during the rule of the half-Oromo emperor Iyoas I.

The Warra Himano (1700–1916) would use Islam as a resistance ideology with vigorous, creative ways to resist the Christian Abyssinian territorial expansion and cultural encroachment. This was the second Muslim Oromo state to be established in Wollo, the first to declare jihad in the name and interest of Islam, the first to adopt the title of imam for its rulers and the longest lasting one. It reached its zenith of power under Imam Muhammad Ali (1771–1785), a far sighted leader, a resourceful politician and a fervent Muslim who made Sharia the basis of the law in the state.

Under another ruler, Amade II (1815–1838), Wollo would become the most active centre of Islamic teachings in the Horn of Africa. Amade is even reported to have asked Muhammad Ali of Egypt to help him conquer and convert northern Ethiopia and its peoples. He was considered by many to be one of the most important, if not the most important, Muslim ruler of Ethiopia. By his time, Wollo had become a veritable Islamic state in the heartland of Christian Ethiopia; the rise of Muslim Oromo power in Wollo was instrumental in the revival of Christian nationalism in Abyssinia.

The Warra Himano dynasty would convert many Amhara Christians to Islam during its rule, and at the zenith of its power Mammadoch dynasty had their hegemony accepted in the various parts of Wollo: Ambasel, Qallu, Borena, Wore-Illu and Amhara Sayint. The territory extended from the Abbay river in the west to the Qallu and Garfa area in the east and the Wänchit and Jama rivers in the south. Moreover, under the leadership of Kollasse Amade, the Mammedoch had even started to take part in the power struggle among the lords of northern Ethiopia at Gonder.

Notable rulers such as Ras Mikael of Wollo King of Wollo and the uncrowned emperor of Ethiopia, Lij Iyasu (1913–1916), descend from this ruling family.

Both peaceful integration and violent competition between Oromos and other neighboring ethnicities such as the Amhara, Sidama, Afar and the Somali affected politics in the Oromo community. Between 1500 and 1800, there were waves of wars and struggle between highland Christians, coastal Muslims and the polytheist population in the Horn of Africa. This caused a major redistribution of populations. The northern, eastern and western movement of the Oromos from the south around 1535 mirrored the large-scale expansion by Somalis inland. The 1500–1800 period also saw relocation of the Amhara people, and helped influence contemporary ethnic politics in Ethiopia.

According to oral and literary evidence, the Borana Oromo clan and Garre Somali clan mutually victimized each other in seventeenth and eighteenth centuries, particularly near their eastern borders. There were also periods of relative peace.

Demographics

The Oromos are the largest ethnic group in Ethiopia (35.8% of the population),  numbering about 40 million. They are predominantly concentrated in the Oromia Region in central Ethiopia, the largest region in the country by both population and area. They speak Afaan Oromoo, the official language of Oromia. Oromos constitute the third most populous ethnic group among Africans as a whole and the most populous among Horners specifically.

Oromo also have a notable presence in northern Kenya in the Marsabit County, Isiolo County and Tana River County Totaling to about 656,636: 276,236 Borana 141,200 Gabra 158,000 Orma 45,200 Sakuye 20,000 Waata 16,000 Munyo Yaya. There are also Oromo in the former Wollo and Tigray provinces of Ethiopia.

Subgroups

The Oromo consist of two major branches that break down into an assortment of clan families. From west to east: the Borana Oromo, also called the Booranaa, are a semi-pastoralist group living in southern Oromia and northern Kenya. The Borana inhabit the Borena Zone of the Oromia Region of Ethiopia and the former Northern Frontier District (now northern Kenya) of Northern Kenya. They speak a dialect of Afaan Oromo, the Oromo language.
Barentu/Barentoo or (older) Baraytuma is the other moiety of the Oromo people. The Barentu Oromo inhabit the eastern parts of the Oromia Region in the Zones of West Hararghe, Arsi Zone, Bale Zone, Dire Dawa city, the Jijiga Zone of the Somali Region, Administrative Zone 3 of the Afar Region, Oromia Zone of the Amhara Region, and are also found in the Raya Azebo Aanaas in the Tigray Region.

Language

Oromo is written with Latin characters known as Qubee. The Sapalo script was invented by the Oromo scholar Sheikh Bakri Sapalo (also known by his birth name, Abubaker Usman Odaa) during the 1950s. Oromo serves as one of the official languages of Ethiopia and is also the working language of several of the states within the Ethiopian federal system including Oromia, Harari and Dire Dawa regional states and of the Oromia Zone in the Amhara Region. It is a language of primary education in Oromia, Harari, Dire Dawa, Benishangul-Gumuz and Addis Ababa and of the Oromia Zone in the Amhara Region. It is used as an internet language for federal websites along with Tigrinya.

More than 33.8% of Ethiopia's population are Oromo mother-tongue speakers, which makes it the most widely spoken primary language in Ethiopia. It is also the most widely spoken Cushitic language and the fourth-most widely spoken language of Africa, after Arabic, Hausa and Swahili. Oromo is spoken as a first language by more than 37 million Oromo people in Ethiopia and by an additional half-million in parts of northern and eastern Kenya. It is also spoken by smaller numbers of emigrants in other African countries, such as South Africa, Libya, Egypt and Sudan.
Besides first language speakers, a number of members of other ethnicities who are in contact with the Oromo speak it as a second language, such as the Omotic-speaking Bambassi and the Nilo-Saharan-speaking Kwama in western Ethiopia.

Religion

The Oromo followed their traditional religion, Waaqeffanna, and were resistant to religious conversion before assimilation in sultanates and Christian kingdoms. The influential 30-year war from 1529 to 1559 between the three parties – the Oromo who followed Waaqeffanna, the Christians and the Muslims – dissipated the political strengths of all three. The religious beliefs of the Oromo people evolved in this socio-political environment. In the 19th century and first half of the 20th century, Protestant or Catholic missionaries' efforts spread Christianity among the Oromo. Organizations included the Sudan Interior Mission, the Bible Churchmen's Missionary Society, the Seventh-Day Adventists, the United Presbyterian Mission of the USA, the Church Mission to the Jews, Evangeliska Fosterlands-Stiftelsen, Bibeltrogna Vänner, and the Hermannsburg Mission.

In the mid and late 19th century, the Ethiopian emperors were faced with widespread rifts and disputes in the Ethiopian Orthodox Tewahedo Church and crippling ethnic and religious divisions that plagued the empire and exposed it to the intervention and meddling of neighboring Muslims (especially Egypt and the Ottoman Empire) and European powers. The emperors that ruled in that period, Tewodros II, Yohannes IV, and Menelik II, thus strove to suppress disunion and schism both within and without the Ethiopian Church and were often intolerant towards other religions. The Wollo Oromo, the Arsi Oromo, and the Tulama Oromo were among those who violently clashed with the Ethiopian expansion in the region in the 19th century and the empire's attempts at enforcing unity through the propagation of Orthodox Christianity, as the majority of these groups were not Christian but Muslims.

In the 2007 Ethiopian census for Oromia region, which included Oromo and some non-Oromo residents, there was a total of 13,107,963 followers of Christianity (8,204,908 Orthodox, 4,780,917 Protestant, 122,138 Catholic), 12,835,410 followers of Islam, 887,773 followers of traditional religions, and 162,787 followers of other religions. Accordingly, the Oromia region is between 45% to 40% Christian (8,204,908 or 30.4% Orthodox, 4,780,917 or 17.7% Protestant, 122,138 Catholic), 55% to 60% Muslim and 3.3% followers of traditional religions

According to a 2016 estimate by James Minahan, about half of the Oromo people are Sunni Muslim, a third are Ethiopian Orthodox, and the rest are mostly Protestants or follow their traditional religious beliefs. The traditional religion is more common in southern Oromo populations and Christianity more common in and near the urban centers, while Islam is more common near the Somali border and in the north.

Cuisine

Oromo dishes
The Oromos' cuisine consists of various vegetable and meat side dishes and entrées. Oromo do not eat pork. Ancestors of today's Oromo people in a region of Oromia in Ethiopia were the first to cultivate the coffee plant and recognise the energising effect of coffee.

Foon Akaawwii – minced roasted meat; specially seasoned
Waaddii – outdoor grilled meat on heat bead or wood fire
Anchotte – a common dish in the western part of Oromia (Wallaga)
Baduu – liquid remaining after milk has been curdled and strained (cheese)
Maarqaa – porridge like made from wheat, honey, milk, chili and spices
Chechebsaa – shredded biddena stir-fried with chili powder and cheese
Qoocco – also known as kocho, it is not the Gurage type of kocho but a different kind; a common dish in the western part of Oromia 
Itto –  comprises all sorts of vegetables (tomato, potato, ginger, garlic), meat (lamb)
Chukkoo – also known as Micira; a sweet flavor of whole grain, seasoned with butter and spices
Chororsaa – a common dish in the western part of Oromia
Dokkee – a common dish throughout Oromia state
Qince – similar to Marqaa but made from shredded grains as opposed to flour
Qorso (Akaayii) – as snacks in Oromia state
Dadhii –  A drink made from honey
Farsho – Beer-like Beverage, made from barley
Buna –  Ethiopian coffee

Culture

Gadaa 

Oromo people governed themselves in accordance with the Gadaa system long before the 16th century. The system regulates the political, economic, social and religious activities of the community. Oromo were traditionally a culturally homogeneous society with genealogical ties. A male born in the Oromo clan went through five stages of eight years, where his life established his role and status for consideration to a Gadaa office. Every eight years, the Oromo would choose by consensus nine leaders for the office. A leader elected by the Gadaa system remains in power only for eight years, with an election taking place at the end of those eight years.

There are three Gadaa organs of governance: Gadaa Council, Gadaa General Assembly, and the Qallu Assembly. The Gadaa Council is considered the collective achievement of the members of the Gadaa class. It is responsible for coordinating irreecha. The Gadaa General Assembly is the legislative body of the Gadaa government, while the Qallu Assembly is the religious institution.

Calendar

The Oromo people developed a lunisolar calendar; different geographically and religiously distinct Oromo communities use the same calendar. This calendar is sophisticated and similar to ones found among the Chinese, the Hindus and the Mayans. It was tied to the traditional religion of the Oromos, and used to schedule the Gadaa system of elections and power transfer.

The Borana Oromo calendar system was once thought to be based upon an earlier Cushitic calendar developed around 300 BC found at Namoratunga. Reconsideration of the Namoratunga site led astronomer and archaeologist Clive Ruggles to conclude that there is no relationship. The new year of the Oromo people, according to this calendar, falls in the month of October. The calendar has no weeks but a name for each day of the month. It is a lunar-stellar calendar system.

Oromumma
The word is derived by combining Oromo with the Arabic term ummah (community). However, according to Terje Østebø and other scholars, this term is a neologism from the late 1990s and its link Oromo ethno-nationalism and Salafi Islamic discourse has been questioned, in their disagreement with Christian Amhara and other ethnic groups.

The Oromo people, depending on their geographical location and historical events, have variously converted to Islam, to Christianity, or remained with their traditional religion (Waaqeffanna). According to Gemetchu Megerssa, the subjective reality is that "neither traditional Oromo rituals nor traditional Oromo beliefs function any longer as a cohesive and integral symbol system" for the Oromo people, not just regionally but even locally. The cultural and ideological divergence within the Oromo people, in part from their religious differences, is apparent from the constant impetus for negotiations between broader Oromo spokespersons and those Oromo who are Ahl al-Sunna followers, states Terje Østebø. The internally evolving cultural differences within the Oromos have led some scholars such as Mario Aguilar and Abdullahi Shongolo to conclude that "a common identity acknowledged by all Oromo in general does not exist".

Social stratification
 
Like other ethnic groups in the Horn of Africa and East Africa, Oromo people regionally developed social stratification consisting of four hierarchical strata. Below these two upper castes were the despised castes of artisans, and at the lowest level were the slaves.

In the Islamic Kingdom of Jimma, the Oromo society's caste strata predominantly consisted of endogamous, inherited artisanal occupations. Each caste group has specialized in a particular occupation such as iron working, carpentry, weapon making, pottery, weaving, leather-working and hunting.

Each caste in the Oromo society had a designated name. While slaves were a stratum within the society, many Oromos, regardless of caste, were sold into slavery elsewhere. By the 19th century, Oromo slaves were sought after and a major part of slaves sold in Gondar and Gallabat slave markets at Ethiopia-Sudan border, as well as the Massawa and Tajura markets on the Red Sea.

Livelihood 

The Oromo people are engaged in many occupations. The southern Oromo (specifically the Borana Oromo) are largely pastoralists who raise goats and cattle. Other Oromo groups have a more diverse economy which includes agriculture and work in urban centers. Some Oromo also sell many products and food items like coffee beans (coffee being a favorite beverage among the Oromo) at local markets.

Contemporary era

Human rights issues
In December 2009, a 96-page report titled "Human Rights in Ethiopia: Through the Eyes of the Oromo Diaspora", compiled by the Advocates for Human Rights, documented human rights violations against the Oromo in Ethiopia under three successive regimes: the Ethiopian Empire under Haile Selassie, the Marxist Derg and the Ethiopian People's Revolutionary Democratic Front (EPRDF), dominated by members of the Tigrayan People's Liberation Front (TPLF) and which was accused to have arrested approximately 20,000 suspected OLF members, to have driven most OLF leadership into exile, and to have effectively neutralized the OLF as a political force in Ethiopia.

According to the Office of the United Nations High Commissioner for Human Rights, the Oromia Support Group (OSG) recorded 594 extrajudicial killings of Oromos by Ethiopian government security forces and 43 disappearances in custody between 2005 and August 2008.

Starting in November 2015, during a wave of mass protests, mainly by Oromos, over the expansion of the municipal boundary of the city of Addis Ababa into Oromia, over 500 people have been killed and many more have been injured, according to human-rights advocates and independent monitors. The protests have since spread to other ethnic groups and encompass wider social grievances. Ethiopia declared a state of emergency in response to Oromo and Amhara protests in October 2016.

With the rising political unrest, there was ethnic violence involving the Oromo such as the Oromo–Somali clashes between the Oromo and the ethnic Somalis, leading to up to 400,000 displaced in 2017. Gedeo–Oromo clashes between the Oromo and the Gedeo people in the south of the country and continued violence in the Oromia-Somali border region led to Ethiopia having the largest number of people in the world fleeing their homes in 2018, with 1.4 million newly displaced people. In September 2018, in the minority protest that took place in Oromia near Addis Ababa, 23 people were killed following the deaths of 43 Oromos in the Addis Ababa neighborhood of Saris Abo. Some have blamed the rise in ethnic violence in the Oromia Special Zone Surrounding Finfinne on the Prime Minister Abiy Ahmed for giving space to groups formerly banned by previous Tigrayan-led governments, such as the Oromo Liberation Front and Ginbot 7.

Protests broke out across Ethiopia, chiefly in the Oromia region, following the assassination of musician Hachalu Hundessa on 29 June 2020, leading to the deaths of at least 200 people. On 30 June 2020, a statue of former Ethiopian emperor Haile Selassie in London was destroyed by Oromo protestors in response to the killing of popular singer Hachalu Hundessa and grievances of the Oromo language being banned from education, and the use in administration under the Haile Selassie regime.

Political organizations
The Oromo have played a major role in the internal dynamics of Ethiopia. Accordingly, Oromos played major roles in all three main political movements in Ethiopia (centralist, federalist and secessionist) during the 19th and 20th century. In addition to holding high powers during the centralist government and the monarchy, the Raya Oromos in the Tigray regional state played a major role in the Weyane revolt, challenging Emperor Haile Selassie I 's rule in the 1940s. Simultaneously, both federalist and secessionist political forces developed inside the Oromo community.

At present a number of ethnic-based political organizations have been formed to promote the interests of the Oromo. The first was the Mecha and Tulama Self-Help Association was founded in January 1963, but was disbanded by the government after several increasingly tense confrontations in November 1966. Later groups include the Oromo Liberation Front (OLF), Oromo Federalist Democratic Movement (OFDM), the United Liberation Forces of Oromia (ULFO), the Islamic Front for the Liberation of Oromia (IFLO), the Oromia Liberation Council (OLC), the Oromo National Congress (ONC, recently changed to OPC) and others. Another group, the Oromo People's Democratic Organization (OPDO), is one of the four parties that form the ruling Ethiopian People's Revolutionary Democratic Front (EPRDF) coalition. The ONC, for example, was part of the United Ethiopian Democratic Forces coalition that challenged the EPRDF in the Ethiopian general elections of 2005.

A number of these groups seek to create an independent Oromo nation, some using armed force. Meanwhile, the ruling OPDO and several opposition political parties in the Ethiopian parliament believe in ethnic federalism. However, most Oromo opposition parties in Ethiopia condemn the economic and political inequalities in the country. Progress has been very slow, with the Oromia International Bank established in 2008, though the Oromo-owned Awash International Bank started in the early 1990s.

Radio broadcasts began in the Oromo language in Somalia in 1960 by Radio Mogadishu. Within Kenya there has been radio broadcasting in Oromo (in the Borana dialect) on the Voice of Kenya since at least the 1980s. Broadcasting in Oromo thought in Ethiopia as it would break radio until 1974 revolution in which Radio Harar began broadcasting. Abuse of Oromo media is widespread in Ethiopia and reflective of the general oppression Oromos face in the country.

Various human rights organizations have publicized the government persecution of Oromos in Ethiopia for decades. In 2008, the OFDM opposition party condemned the government's indirect role in the death of hundreds of Oromos in western Ethiopia. According to Amnesty International, "between 2011 and 2014, at least 5000 Oromos have been arrested based on their actual or suspected peaceful opposition to the government. These include thousands of peaceful protestors and hundreds of opposition political party members. The government anticipates a high level of opposition in Oromia, and signs of dissent are sought out and regularly, sometimes pre-emptively, suppressed. In numerous cases, actual or suspected dissenters have been detained without charge or trial, killed by security services during protests, arrests and in detention."

According to Amnesty International, there is a sweeping repression in the Oromo region of Ethiopia. On 12 December 2015, the German broadcaster Deutsche Welle reported violent protests in the Oromo region of Ethiopia in which more than 20 students were killed. According to the report, the students were protesting against the government's re-zoning plan named 'Addis Ababa Master Plan'.

On 2 October 2016, between 55 and 300 festival-goers were massacred at the most sacred and largest event among the Oromo, the Irreechaa cultural thanksgiving festival. In one day, dozens were killed and many injured. Every year, millions of Oromos gather in Bishoftu for this annual celebration. That year Ethiopian security forces responded to peaceful protests by firing tear gas and live bullets at over two million people surrounded by a lake and cliffs. In the week that followed, angry youth attacked government buildings and private businesses. On 8 October, the government responded with an abusive and far-reaching state of emergency, which was lifted in August 2017. During the state of emergency, security forces arbitrarily detained over 21,000 people.

Notable people

See also
Irreechaa
Cushitic languages
Barentu (Oromo)
Borana people
Oromia
List of Oromo subgroups and clans
Oromo language
Oromia zone
Gadaa

References

Further reading

 Tsega Etefa, "Integration and Peace in East Africa: A History of the Oromo Nation". New York: Palgrave Macmillan, 2012. 
 Mohammed Hassan, "The Oromo of Ethiopia, A History 1570–1860". Trenton: Red Sea Press, 1994. 
 Herbert S. Lewis. "A Galla Monarchy: Jimma Abba Jifar, Ethiopia 1830–1932". Madison: The University of Wisconsin Press, 1965.
 
 Temesgen M. Erena, Oromia: 'Civilisation, Colonisation And Underdevelopment, Oromia Quarterly, No.1, July 2002, .

External links

Oromo

 
Ethnic groups in Ethiopia
Ethnic groups in Kenya
Ethnic groups in Somalia
Cushitic-speaking peoples